Inland Northern (American) English, also known in American linguistics as the Inland North or Great Lakes dialect, is an American English dialect spoken primarily by White Americans in a geographic band reaching from the major urban areas of Upstate New York westward along the Erie Canal and through much of the U.S. Great Lakes region. The most distinctive Inland Northern accents are spoken in Chicago, Milwaukee, Detroit, Cleveland, Buffalo, Rochester, and Syracuse. The dialect can be heard as far west as eastern Iowa and even among certain demographics in the Twin Cities, Minnesota. Some of its features have also infiltrated a geographic corridor from Chicago southwest along historic Route 66 into St. Louis, Missouri; today, the corridor shows a mixture of both Inland North and Midland American accents. Linguists often characterize the western Great Lakes region's dialect separately as North-Central American English.

The early 20th-century accent of the Inland North was the basis for the term "General American", though the regional accent has since altered, due to the Northern Cities Vowel Shift: its now-defining chain shift of vowels that began in the 1930s or possibly earlier. A 1969 study first formally showed lower-middle-class women leading the regional population in the first two stages (raising of the  vowel and fronting of the  vowel) of this shift, documented since the 1970s as comprising five distinct stages. Evidence in the mid-2010s has suggested a reversal of some features of the Northern Cities Shift in certain locations.

Geographic distribution 

The dialect region called the "Inland North" consists of western and central New York State (Utica, Ithaca, Syracuse, Rochester, Buffalo, Binghamton, Jamestown, Fredonia, Olean); northern Ohio (Akron, Cleveland, Toledo), Michigan's Lower Peninsula (Detroit, Flint, Grand Rapids, Lansing); northern Indiana (Gary, South Bend); northern Illinois (Chicago, Rockford); southeastern Wisconsin (Kenosha, Racine, Milwaukee); and, largely, northeastern Pennsylvania's Wyoming Valley/Coal Region (Scranton and Wilkes-Barre).  This is the dialect spoken in part of America's chief industrial region, an area sometimes known as the Rust Belt. Northern Iowa and southern Minnesota may also variably fall within the Inland North dialect region; in the Twin Cities, educated middle-aged men in particular have been documented as aligning to the accent, though this is not necessarily the case among other demographics of that urban area.

Linguists identify the "St. Louis Corridor", extending from Chicago down into St. Louis, as a dialectally remarkable area, because young and old speakers alike have a Midland accent, except for a single middle generation born between the 1920s and 1940s, who have an Inland Northern accent diffused into the area from Chicago.

Erie, Pennsylvania, though in the geographic area of the "Inland North" and featuring some speakers of this dialect, never underwent the Northern Cities Shift and often shares more features with Western Pennsylvania English due to contact with Pittsburghers, particularly with Erie as their choice of city for summer vacations. Many African Americans in Detroit and other Northern cities are multidialectal and also or exclusively use African-American Vernacular English rather than Inland Northern English, but some do use the Inland Northern dialect.

Social factors
The dialect's progression across the Midwest has stopped at a general boundary line traveling through central Ohio, Indiana, and Illinois and then western Wisconsin, on the other sides of which speakers have continued to maintain their Midland and North Central accents. Sociolinguist William Labov theorizes that this separation reflects a political divide and a controlled study of his shows that Inland Northern speakers tend to be more associated with liberal politics than those of the other dialects, especially as Americans continue to self-segregate in residence based on ideological concerns. President Barack Obama, for example, has a mild Inland Northern accent.

Phonology and phonetics 

A Midwestern accent (which may refer to other dialectal accents as well), Chicago accent, or Great Lakes accent are all common names in the United States for the sound quality produced by speakers of this dialect. Many of the characteristics listed here are not necessarily unique to the region and are oftentimes found elsewhere in the Midwest.

Northern Cities Vowel Shift
The Northern Cities Vowel Shift or Northern Cities Shift is a chain shift of vowels and the defining accent feature of the Inland North dialect region, though it can also be found, variably, in the neighboring Upper Midwest and Western New England accent regions.

As for  fronting, it can go beyond  to the front , and may, for the most advanced speakers, even be close to —so that pot or sod come to be pronounced how a mainstream American speaker would say pat or sad; e.g. coupon .

Lowering of 
As a result, for example, people affected by the shift may pronounce caught the way speakers without the shift say cot, with both using the vowel . Even so, however, there is a definite scattering of Inland North speakers who are in a state of transition towards a cot–caught merger; this is particularly evident in northeastern Pennsylvania.

Backing or lowering of 
As the vowel  is pronounced with the tongue farther back and lower in the mouth than in the sound , this change is called "lowering and/or backing".

Backing of 
People with the shift pronounce bus so that it sounds more like boss to people without the shift.

Backing or lowering of 

Vowels before 
Before , only  undergoes the Northern Cities Vowel Shift, so that the vowel in start  varies much like the one in lot  described above. Inland Northern American English features the north-force merger, the Mary-marry-merry merger, the mirror–nearer and – mergers, the hurry-furry merger, and the nurse-letter merger, all unremarkable in most of the US.

History of the Northern Cities Vowel Shift 
William Labov et al.'s Atlas of North American English (2006) presents the first historical understandings about the order in which the Inland North's vowels shifted. These two vowel changes were first recognized and reported in 1967. While these were certainly the first two vowel shifts of this accent, and Labov et al. assume that  raising occurred first, they also admit that the specifics of time and place are unclear. In fact, real-time evidence of a small number of Chicagoans born between 1890 and 1920 suggests that  fronting occurred first, starting by 1900 at the latest, and was followed by  raising sometime in the 1920s.

Altogether, this constitutes a chain shift of vowels, identified as such in 1972, and known by linguists as the "Northern Cities (Vowel) Shift" or NCS: the defining pattern of the current Inland Northern accent.

Possible motivations for the Shift
Migrants from all over the Northeastern U.S. traveled west to the rapidly industrializing Great Lakes area in the decades after the Erie Canal opened in 1825, and Labov suggests that the Inland North's general  raising originated from the diverse and incompatible /æ/ raising patterns of these various migrants mixing into a new, simpler pattern. He posits that this hypothetical dialect-mixing event, which initiated the larger Northern Cities Shift (NCS), occurred by about 1860 in upstate New York, and the later stages of the NCS are merely those that logically followed (a "pull chain"). There is also evidence for an alternative theory, according to which the Great Lakes area—settled primarily by western New Englanders—simply inherited Western New England English and developed that dialect's vowel shifts further. 20th-century Western New England English variably showed NCS-like  and  pronunciations, which may have already existed among 19th-century New England settlers, though this has been contested. Another theory, not mutually exclusive with the others, is that the Great Migration of African Americans intensified White Northerners' participation in the NCS in order to differentiate their accents from Black ones.

Reversals of the Shift
Recent evidence suggests that the Shift has begun to reverse in at least some of the Inland North, such as Lansing, Michigan, and Ogdensburg, Rochester, and Syracuse, New York, in particular with regard to  fronting and  raising (though raising is persisting before nasal consonants, as is the General American norm). Several possible reasons have been proposed for the reversal, including growing stigma connected with the accent and the working-class identity it represents.

Other phonetics
Rhoticity: As in General American, Inland North speech is rhotic, and the r sound is typically the retroflex  or perhaps, more accurately, a bunched or molar .
Canadian raising: Two phenomena typically exist, corresponding with identical phenomena in Canadian English, involving tongue-raising in the nuclei (beginning points) of gliding vowels that start in an open front (or central) unrounded position:
The raising of the tongue for the nucleus of the gliding vowel  is found in the Inland North when the vowel sound appears before any voiceless consonant, thus distinguishing, for example, between writer and rider by vowel quality. In the Inland North, unlike some other dialects, the raising occurs even before certain voiced consonants, including in the words fire, tiger, iron, and spider.
The nucleus of  may be more backed than in other common North American accents (towards  or ).
Similarly, the traditionally high back vowel  tends to be conservative and less fronted in the North than in other regions, though it still undergoes some fronting after coronal consonants.
The vowel in  can raise toward  in words like beg, negative, or segment, except in Michigan.
This was parodied in the Saturday Night Live comedy sketch "Bill Swerski's Superfans," in which characters hailing from Chicago pronounce "The Bears" as "Da Bears."<ref>Salmons, Joseph; Purnell, Thomas (2008 draft). "[bris.ac.uk/german/hison/reading/salmonsandpurnell.pdf Contact and the Development of American English]". Handbook of Language Contact, ed. Ray Hickey. Blackwell.</ref>Caramel is typically pronounced with two syllables as carmel.

 Vocabulary 

Note that not all of these terms, here compared with other regions, are necessarily unique only to the Inland North, though they appear most strongly in this region:boulevard as a synonym for island (in the sense of a grassy area in the middle of some streets)crayfish for a freshwater crustaceandrinking fountain as a synonym for water fountainexpressway as a synonym for highwayfaucet for an indoor water tap (not Southern spigot)goose pimples as a synonym for goose bumpspit for the seed of a peach (not Southern stone or seed)pop for a sweet, bubbly soft drink (not Eastern and Californian soda, nor Southern coke)
The "soda/pop line" has been found to run between Western New York State (Buffalo residents say "pop", Syracuse residents who used to say "pop" until sometime in the 1970s now say "soda", and Rochester residents say either. Lollipops are also known as "suckers" in this region. Eastern Wisconsinites around Milwaukee and some Chicagoans are also an exception, using the word soda.) sucker for a lollipop (hard candy on a stick)teeter totter as a synonym for seesawtennis shoes for generic athletic shoes (not Northeastern sneakers, except in New York State and Pennsylvania)

Individual cities and sub-regions also have their own terms; for example:bubbler, in a large portion of Wisconsin around Milwaukee, for water fountain (in addition to the synonym drinking fountain, also possible throughout the Inland North)cash station, in the Chicago area, for ATMDevil's Night, particularly in Michigan, for the night before Halloween (not Northeastern Mischief Night)doorwalls, in Detroit, for sliding glass doors gapers' block or gapers' delay, in Chicago, Milwaukee and Detroit; or gawk block, in Detroit, for traffic congestion caused by rubberneckinggym shoes, in Chicago and Detroit, for generic athletic shoesparty store, in Michigan, for a liquor storerummage sale, in Wisconsin, as a synonym for garage sale or yard saletreelawn, in Cleveland and Michigan; devilstrip or devil's strip in Akron, Ohio; and right-of-way in Wisconsin and parkway in Chicago for the grass between the sidewalk and the streetyous(e) or youz, in northeastern Pennsylvania around its urban center of Scranton, for you guys''; in this sub-region, there is notable self-awareness of the Inland Northern dialect (locally called by various names, including "Coalspeak")

Notable lifelong native speakers 

 Hillary Clinton – "playing down her flat Chicago accent"
 Joan Cusack – "a great distinctive voice" she says is due to "my Chicago accent... my A's are all flat"
 Richard M. Daley – "makes no effort to tame a thick Chicago accent"
 Jimmy Dore – "I think that Chicago comics like Jimmy Dore bring my Wisconsin/Chicago accent back with a vengence."
 Kevin Dunn – "a blue-collar attitude and the Chicago accent to match" 
 David Draiman – "distinct Chicago accent"
 Rahm Emanuel – "more refined (if still very Chicago)"
 Dennis Farina – "rich Chicago accent"
 Chris Farley – "beatific Wisconsin accent"
 Dennis Franz – "tough-guy Chicago accent"
 Sean Giambrone – "Sean, whose Chicago accent is thick enough to cut with a knife"
 John Goodman – "Goodman delivered a completely authentic Inland North accent.... It wasn't an act."
 Susan Hawk – "a Midwestern truck driver whose accent and etiquette epitomized the stereotype of the tacky, abrasive, working-class character"
 Bill Lipinski – "I could live only 100 miles from the gentleman from Illinois (Mr. Lipinski) and he would have an accent and I do not"
 Jim "Mr. Skin" McBride – "a clipped Chicago accent"
 Michael Moore – "a Flintoid, with a nasal, uncosmopolitan accent" and "a recognisable blue-collar Michigan accent"
 Bob Odenkirk
 Suze Orman – "broad, Midwestern accent"
 Iggy Pop – "plainspoken Midwestern accent"
 Paul Ryan – "may be the first candidate on a major presidential ticket to feature some of the Great Lakes vowels prominently"
 Michael Symon – "Michael Symon's local accent gives him an honest, working-class vibe"
 Lily Tomlin – "Tomlin's Detroit accent"

See also 

List of dialects of the English language
List of English words from indigenous languages of the Americas
American English regional differences
North Central American English
Western New England English

References

Sources

External links 
Chicago Dialect Samples
The Guide to Buffalo English
The Northern Cities Vowel Shift 
NPR interview with Professor William Labov about the shift
PBS resource from the show "Do you Speak American?"
Select Annotated Bibliography On the Speech of Buffalo, NY
Telsur Project Maps

American English
Culture of the Midwestern United States
Culture of Buffalo, New York
Culture of Chicago
Culture of Cleveland
Culture of Detroit
Culture of Milwaukee
Culture of Rochester, New York
Culture of Syracuse, New York
Illinois culture
Indiana culture
Michigan culture
New York (state) culture
Ohio culture
Languages of Pennsylvania
Wisconsin culture
Culture of Grand Rapids, Michigan
Culture of Madison, Wisconsin
Culture of Green Bay, Wisconsin
Culture of Toledo, Ohio
Culture of Scranton, Pennsylvania
Culture of Allentown, Pennsylvania